Laze pri Kostelu  is a small settlement in the Municipality of Kostel in southern Slovenia. It lies in a small valley east of Kuželj. The area is part of the traditional region of Lower Carniola and is now included in the Southeast Slovenia Statistical Region.

Name
The name of the settlement was changed from Laze to Laze pri Kostelu in 1955.

References

External links
Laze pri Kostelu on Geopedia

Populated places in the Municipality of Kostel